Ysgol Gyfun Gymraeg Bro Myrddin is a Welsh-medium school in Carmarthenshire, Wales. It is situated near the village of Croesyceiliog, about 1 miles (2 km) south of Carmarthen. Myrddin, the Welsh name of the legendary figure Merlin, is traditionally associated with the town of Carmarthen (Caerfyrddin: Myrddin's fort), and Bro Myrddin means "Myrddin's country (or vale)".

Approximately 79% of pupils come from Welsh-speaking homes; in 2022 all pupils could speak Welsh to first-language standard.

History
The School was founded in 1978, on the premises of the former Queen Elizabeth's Grammar School for Boys, Carmarthen. In 1996 the school was moved to its current purpose-built campus at Croesyceiliog. Its first Pennaeth (Headteacher) was Mr Gareth Evans, who was succeeded upon his retirement in 1997 by Mr Eric Jones, and then by Mr Dorian Williams, in 2006. The latest Headteacher is Dr Llinos Jones, who took Mr Williams' place at his retirement in 2014.

Category change 
In September 2016 the school was changed to a Category CC school, which means that it is a designated Welsh school. Bro Myrddin was first in the county to become a MW school. Furthermore, all National Curriculum subjects are taught in Welsh (except for English), from year 7 in 2016 and for every subsequent year. 
There were many consultations and discussions with Parents future, past and present, pupils past and present, members of staff and the local community. And there were some concerns raised, the main concern was studying in Universities where the Mathematics and Science training is through the medium of English after following a Welsh course at the school, some thought that this would be a disadvantage. On the other hand, there were numerous benefits of this change including that it will encourage the Welsh ethos outside the classroom. And reduce the workload of the teachers who currently have to produce bilingual resources.

Ethos
The school's motto is 'Heb Ddysg Heb Ddeall', which translates as 'Without learning there is no understanding'. The school colours are lilac and black.

Houses
The school has four houses (which are referred to using the Welsh 'Llys'): Hengwrt (house colour: green), Hergest (red), Llwydiarth (black) and Peniarth (blue). The four houses annually compete in the school's own version of the Eisteddfod, in which there is a day of singing, playing instruments, reciting and numerous other events – held on the nearest Friday to St David’s day, and a sports day held in the summer term, also numerous events are held during the year.

Musical
Approximately every 3 years a musical is performed in the local theatre. The 2016 musical was called 'Chwarae Cuddio' ('Hide and Seek' in Welsh). The 2019 musical 'Rhif 1 Heol Penlan' was staged at the Lyric Theatre between the 20th to the 22nd of November. This original musical was about the lively history of the Carmarthen Union Workhouse in 1837.

Results

2007: 82.8% of 15-year-old pupils achieved 5 or more A* – C grades at GCSE or equivalent

2007: 81.9% of 17-year-old pupils achieved 2 or more A – C grades at A/AS level or equivalent

2015: 81.7% of 15-year-old pupils achieved 5 or more A* – C grades at GCSE

2016: 88.0% of 15-year-old pupils achieved 5 or more A* – G grades at GCSE

Curriculum
Core: Welsh, Maths, English and Science
Humanities: History, Geography, and Religious Studies
Creative subjects: Drama, Art and Design, and Music
Technology: ICT, Resistant Materials, Catering, Health and Social Care, Textiles, Furniture *Manufacture and Graphic products
Foreign languages: French, German, or Spanish
Other: Business Studies

Notable alumni

Politics
 Llyr Huws Gruffydd – Politician

Arts
 Euros Childs – Musician, member of Gorky's Zygotic Mynci
 Richard James – Musician, member of Gorky's Zygotic Mynci
 Elis James – Comedian and actor
 John Lawrence – Musician, member of Gorky's Zygotic Mynci

Sports

 Matthew Bowen – Rugby union player, Ospreys
 Aled Davies - Rugby union player, Saracens and Wales national rugby union team
 Mefin Davies – Rugby union player, Leicester Tigers and Wales national rugby union team
 Ryan Elias – Rugby union player who plays for the Llanelli Scarlets at hooker and Wales national rugby union team
 Stephen Jones – Rugby union player, Wasps Rugby and Wales national rugby union team
 Emyr Lewis – Rugby union player
 Rhys Priestland – Rugby union player, Bath Rugby
 Ken Owens – Rugby union player, Llanelli Scarlets
 Aled Thomas – Rugby union & Rugby Union Sevens player London Welsh, Wales national rugby sevens team
 Matthew Stevens – Professional snooker player

References

External links
 Ysgol Gyfun Gymraeg Bro Myrddin web site 
 2010 Inspection Report English
 2015 Inspection report Welsh 
 2016/17 Prospectus

Secondary schools in Carmarthenshire
Educational institutions established in 1978
Welsh-language schools
1978 establishments in Wales